Carbon Copy Cloner is a backup utility for macOS made by Bombich. The app allows people to clone a user's data onto another hard drives or solid state drives. It has been extensively covered in Apple-related publications, and received positive reviews.

History 

Carbon Copy Cloner version 1 was released on January 18, 2002.

Limitation

In 2021, its creator, Mike Bombich, discovered that Apple silicon Macs cannot boot if the internal storage failed, even if booting from an external drive. A minimal version of the Mac OS, residing on the internal storage device, has to verify the integrity of the operating system carried on the backup device before recovery can take place.

Platforms

Carbon Copy Cloner is macOS-exclusive.

See also
 Disk cloning
 Apple File System

References

Further reading

External links
 

Macintosh software
Disk cloning
Backup software for macOS